Jessica Lowndes (born November 8, 1988) is a Canadian actress and singer. She is best known for her roles as Adrianna Tate-Duncan on The CW teen drama series 90210, appearing in several Hallmark Channel movies, and the 2020 Lifetime Channel movie Too Close for Christmas which she co-produced with co-star Chad Michael Murray.

Early life 
Lowndes was born in Vancouver, British Columbia and attended Pacific Academy in Surrey.

Lowndes knew from an early age that she had a passion for singing and acting. Lowndes also produced much of her own music from an early age. During the summer before her senior year, Lowndes worked on a project for Showtime. With encouragement from her parents, Lowndes moved to Los Angeles at the age of 16 and began her career.

Career

Acting 
Lowndes made her acting debut on the 2005 television film Saving Milly as Andrea Kondracke at the age of 16. This was followed by a guest role on an episode of Masters of Horror, she was later cast as Becky, a recurring role in the sitcom Alice, I Think. She also made a guest appearance on Kyle XY. Her next film role was a supporting role in the Lifetime movie To Have and to Hold released in 2005, followed by a pilot called Pretty/Handsome in 2007—which did not get picked up.

In 2008, Lowndes appeared in Autopsy and The Haunting of Molly Hartley along with another recurring role, this time as Mandi, in the television drama series Greek. She also landed a recurring role as Adrianna Tate-Duncan in the series 90210, a spin-off of the '90s teen drama series Beverly Hills, 90210. In November 2008, her role was upgraded to series regular.

Lowndes starred in the Canadian horror film Altitude in 2010. BuddyTV ranked her #58 on its TV's 100 Sexiest Women of 2011 list. In April 2012, she starred in The Devil's Carnival, a short musical film screened on tour.

Lowndes starred in Lionsgate's 2014 action film The Prince alongside Bruce Willis and John Cusack.

In 2015, Lowndes starred in Lifetime's dramatic-thriller comedy film A Deadly Adoption alongside Will Ferrell and Kristen Wiig.

In 2016, Lowndes starred in Hallmark's A December Bride with Daniel Lissing.

Singing 
Lowndes made her musical debut in the pilot episode of TV series 90210 singing "Mama Who Bore Me" from Spring Awakening in the school's musical, in the 2009 episode "Women's Intuition". In the 90210 episode "What's Past is Prologue", Lowndes sang "Jolene" for a rock band audition. She also sang a few other songs as the lead female vocalist on 90210s "The Glorious Steinem"'s band.

Lowndes also performed One More Time (feat. Diego Boneta) in the 90210 episode "Meet the Parent". During season 4 of 90210, her single "Fool" was featured and sung by her character in the episode "Benefit of the Doubt". In the episode "Bride And Prejudice", her song "Teardrops Fall" was featured. "I Don't Want You Anymore" was featured in the episode "Tis Pity". During season 5, her next single "Snake Charmer" was featured in the episode "Into The Wild" and sung by her in "99 Problems". In the second-to-last episode, her song "The Last Time" was sung by her character. Just as she finishes, the stage collapses on her, catches on fire and leaving her trapped under rubble.

In March 2009, she released the song Fly Away on Myspace. She was both the writer, singer and lead guitarist in the track.

On September 19, 2009, Lowndes performed God Bless America for a Dodgers game at the Dodger Stadium in Los Angeles, California.

She was featured on British rapper Ironik's single "Falling In Love", released on October 24, 2010, and revealed on OK! TV that she was finishing off her debut EP in the United Kingdom. She described the album as "sexy, pop dance music, like Rihanna and Katy Perry."

Lowndes later teamed up with music producers James Rendon and Kayden Boche to record a featuring version of French American Idol finalist Jérémy Amelin's single "Undone" — which premiered online on May 6, 2011 and was released worldwide on May 23, 2011.

On October 11, 2011, CBS Records released her debut single "Fool" on iTunes.

Shortly after, Lowndes released her follow-up single "I Wish I Was Gay", alongside its official music video directed by Frank E. Flowers, on November 11, 2011.

On January 25, 2012, Lowndes released her debut EP—featuring singles I Wish I Was Gay and Nothing Like This, along with two new songs Stamp of Love and Go Back.

The Devil's Carnival soundtrack also features a song titled In All My Dreams I Drown performed by Lowndes and released on April 3, 2012.

On May 14, 2012, her single The Other Girl premiered on Complex.com. The single was released on iTunes on May 16, 2012. On February 6, 2013, Lowndes announced that she would release her self-written second EP titled TBT (Throwback Thursday) on March 14, 2013, along with one track off it every Thursdays for four weeks. On February 7, 2013, Aperture Entertainment released Fly Away as the lead single from her EP.

On September 9, 2014, Lowndes released her single Silicone in Stereo. The official music video premiered on September 6, 2014, both on YouTube and Vevo. The song peaked at number 35 on Billboard Canada's Top 50 and number 65 on the US Top 100.

Lowndes was included on People magazine's list of World's Most Beautiful People of 2009, along with co-stars from the series 90210.

Filmography

Film

Television

Discography

Extended plays 
 Nothing Like This (2012)
 TBT (Throwback Thursday) (2013)

Singles

As featured artist

Other appearances

Music videos

Awards 
 2014 : Nominated at the Canadian Screen Awards for her performance in A Mother's Nightmare.
 2009 : Nominated at the Prism Awards for her performance in 90210.

References

External links 

 Official website
 
 

1988 births
21st-century Canadian actresses
Actresses from Vancouver
Canadian child actresses
Canadian dance musicians
Canadian women pop singers
Canadian film actresses
Canadian television actresses
Living people
Musicians from Vancouver
21st-century Canadian women singers
Canadian expatriate actresses in the United States